T-Pain Presents Happy Hour: The Greatest Hits is a greatest hits album by American recording artist T-Pain. It was released on November 24, 2014 on his Nappy Boy record label. The compilation was supported by two singles, "Up Down (Do This All Day)" and "Drankin' Patna".

Track listing

Charts

Certifications

References

T-Pain albums
2014 greatest hits albums